James L. Halsted served as a member of the 1860-61 California State Assembly, representing the 3rd District.

References

Members of the California State Assembly
19th-century American politicians
Year of birth missing
Year of death missing